The Order of the Star or Company of the Star was an order of chivalry founded on 6 November 1351 by John II of France in imitation of the Order of the Garter founded in 1348 by Edward III of England. The inaugural ceremony of the order took place on 6 January 1352 at Saint-Ouen, from which it is sometimes called the Order of Knights of the Noble House of Saint Ouen.

History
The order was established under sanction of Pope Clement VI by the king to garner support from noblemen upset at his abrupt execution of the popular Constable of France Raoul II shortly after his coronation in 1350. It was poorly received with the January 6 meeting being the only meeting as it suffered from poor attendance of inviteee. Even worse was the fact that a small English force took the castle of Guînes while its captain, the Sire of Bavilenghem, attended the meeting.  As a result in October 1352, he recast it in religious terms with a chapter of clergy to celebrate the divine order, funded by lands and wealth seized in prosecution of crimes of lèse-majesté.  However in the end, the king granted little of the wealth promised, finding it more profitable to use confiscated or forfeited lands to buy off noblemen's loyalties.  

The order was inspired by Geoffroy de Charny, theoretician of chivalry and elite knight who ultimately earned the apex privilege of Oriflamme bearer. In part it was intended to prevent the disaster of Crécy and to this end only success on the battlefield counted towards a member's merit, not success in tournaments. By its statutes, members also received a small payment and the order provided housing in retirement. They were sworn not to retreat or move more than four arpents (about six acre's breadths) from a battle. This last provision cost the lives of ninety members of the order at the Battle of Mauron in 1352, and at the Battle of Poitiers in 1356 cost the king his freedom when many, if not most, of his fellow knights of the Star lost their lives. The Order fell rapidly into disuse during John's captivity in London, but afterwards the nominal ranks swelled so enormously  that by the time of Charles V its bestowal was meaningless.

Dress

The badge of the order was a collar with a white star on red enamel; the device Monstrant regibus astra viam ("the star[s] show the way to kings") refers to the Three Kings led by the Star of Bethlehem. If an existing manuscript illumination (illustration) depicting the founding meeting of the Order is accurate, the Order's garb consisted in red robes lined with vair bearing eight-pointed black stars set with various gemstones worn on the upper left side of the mantle.  The exact size of this star and the number and value of the gemstones with which it was set varied according to the knight's own choice since the star was made at the knight's own expense. The insignia also included a gold ring of which the enamelled red bezel was circular; within it an eight-pointed star in white enamel extending past the diameter of the bezel, and within the star a roundel of azure containing a small yellow sun. The name of the knight to whom the ring belonged was inscribed on the outside of the ring around this bezel, presumably so it could be sent back to the king to identify the particular knight who had died in battle. While the Order itself was short-lived, the use of an eight-pointed star worn on the left breast became very influential in the design of the insignia of many later orders of chivalry and still later orders of merit.

The Order also had a red banner sprinkled with white eight-pointed stars and bearing an image of the Virgin at its center.

See also
 Order of Saint Michael
 Order of the Holy Spirit
 Legion of Honour

References

Boulton, D'Arcy Jonathan Dacre. The Knights of the Crown: The Monarchical Orders of Knighthood in Later Medieval Europe, 1325–1520. 2nd ed. Woodbridge, UK: Boydell Press, 2000. 
"Ordre de l'Étoile". Dictionnaire universel d'histoire et de géographie, edd. Marie-Nicolas Bouillet and Alexis Chassang. Paris: Hachette, 1878. 
Ordre de l'Étoile, Orders of Chivalry in France. 
 Gustav Adolph Ackermann,  Ordensbuch, Sämtlicher in Europa blühender und erloschener Orden und Ehrenzeichen. Annaberg, 1855, p 209 n°86 "Orden Unserer liebe Frau von dem edlen Haus" or "Sternorden" - Google Books (Former orders of France : p. 205-214)

Notes

1351 establishments in Europe
1350s establishments in France
Star